Moxon Huddersfield Ltd is a high-end British textile manufacturer of luxury worsted and woollen suiting fabrics. It is located at Yew Tree Mills, Holmbridge, near Holmfirth, Kirklees in Yorkshire.

History

The company was incorporated in 1924 but claims it can trace its roots to the 16th century. In the 1910s, it traded under the name of "B. H. Moxon & Sons" and was located at Springfield Mills, Kirkburton, near Huddersfield. At that time it patented an improvement to the dobby loom. It was incorporated in 1924 In the 1930s, it was exporting to Japan and the United States. In 1950, it moved to a new  site in Kirkburton.
In the 1950s, it was noted for its fancy worsted fabrics, In the 1980s, it was specialized in worsted mohair and silk blends aimed primarily at the Japanese market.

Moxon was one of the first British weavers to replace British Dobcross looms with wider Swiss Sulzer looms. In the early 1960s, after the retirement of Matthew Moxon, it was part of the Tulketh Group, which went into receivership in the early 1970s. It was acquired in 1971 by the Allied Textiles group.

Today

The company was acquired in 1993 by  Firas Chamsi-Pasha, a Syrian former agent of Hield. Mr Chamsi-Pasha dropped 90% of the company's customer base and concentrated its production in the most expensive segment of the cloth market, with retail price up to £4,200 a metre in 2005 for fabrics such as a 12.9 micron wool or a super-fine wool with an 18 ct gold stripe. Mr Chamsi-Pasha marketed Super 180s fabrics in 1998 and Super 210s fabrics in 2000. He claimed in 2003 he was willing to pay "silly prices" to acquire wool with a fiber measuring less than 12 microns and had bought 26 pounds of wool with a fiber measuring 11.5 microns. The company uses antique machinery together with up-to-date equipment, such as a £120,000 scouring machine.
In 2006, Joanne Alsop, then head designer of the company, won a Silver Shuttle Award from the Worshipful Company of Weavers. As of 2010, the company was using 8 looms and producing about 500 single pieces or 35,000 metres per year, using archives going back to the 1930s for ideas. As of 2011, its fabric are priced between £300 ($480) and £11,000 ($17,600) per metre. 95% of the production is exported.

Cashmere socks
In 1999, the company introduced socks woven with a very fine cashmere from the Altai region. They were priced at £400 ($640) in 2011. The company claims to sell 140 pairs per year.

Notes

Sources

Textile manufacturers of England
Textile mills in West Yorkshire
Holmfirth
British companies established in 1924
Manufacturing companies established in 1924